Afroarctia dargei is a moth of the family Erebidae. It was described by Hervé de Toulgoët in 1976. It is found in Cameroon.

References

Endemic fauna of Cameroon
Moths described in 1976
Erebid moths of Africa
Spilosomina